The St. Louis Cardinals 1980 season was the team's 99th season in St. Louis, Missouri and the 89th season in the National League. The Cardinals went 74-88 during the season and finished fourth in the National League East, 17 games behind the eventual NL pennant and World Series champion Philadelphia Phillies.

The Cardinals played the season under four different managers, Ken Boyer (fired June 8 between games of a double-header against the Expos in Montreal), Jack Krol (the second game of the double-header that same day), Whitey Herzog (June 9 until he was hired as the team's general manager in late August, succeeding John Claiborne, who was fired earlier in August) and Red Schoendienst (from late August to end of season).  After the season, Herzog reclaimed the managerial job.

This team set a record for the most Silver Slugger Award winners in one season:  Keith Hernández (first base), Garry Templeton (shortstop), George Hendrick (outfielder), Ted Simmons (catcher), and Bob Forsch (pitcher). Hernández also won a Gold Glove.

Offseason 
 October 17, 1979: Mike Tyson was traded by the Cardinals to the Chicago Cubs for Donnie Moore.
 March 31, 1980: Will McEnaney was released by the St. Louis Cardinals.

Regular season

Season standings

Record vs. opponents

Opening Day starters 
Bobby Bonds
George Hendrick
Keith Hernandez
Ken Oberkfell
Ken Reitz
Tony Scott
Ted Simmons
Garry Templeton
Pete Vuckovich

Notable transactions 
 April 2, 1980: Roger Freed was released by the Cardinals.
 April 7, 1980: Jeff Little was signed as a free agent with the Cardinals.
 April 30, 1980: Pedro Borbón was signed as a free agent with the Cardinals.
 April 30, 1980: Jim Kaat was purchased by the Cardinals from the New York Yankees.
 May 9, 1980: Darold Knowles was released by the Cardinals.
 May 27, 1980: Pedro Borbón was released by the Cardinals.
 June 2, 1980: Jim Lentine was traded by the Cardinals to the Detroit Tigers for Al Greene and John Martin.
 June 3, 1980: Dan Plesac was drafted by the Cardinals in the 2nd round of the 1980 Major League Baseball draft, but did not sign.

Roster

Player stats

Batting

Starters by position 
Note: Pos = Position; G = Games played; AB = At bats; H = Hits; Avg. = Batting average; HR = Home runs; RBI = Runs batted in

Other batters 
Note: G = Games played; AB = At bats; H = Hits; Avg. = Batting average; HR = Home runs; RBI = Runs batted in

Pitching

Starting pitchers 
Note: G = Games pitched; IP = Innings pitched; W = Wins; L = Losses; ERA = Earned run average; SO = Strikeouts

Other pitchers 
Note: G = Games pitched; IP = Innings pitched; W = Wins; L = Losses; ERA = Earned run average; SO = Strikeouts

Relief pitchers 
Note: G = Games pitched; W = Wins; L = Losses; SV = Saves; ERA = Earned run average; SO = Strikeouts

Farm system 

LEAGUE CHAMPIONS: Springfield, Arkansas

References

External links
1980 St. Louis Cardinals at Baseball Reference  
1980 St. Louis Cardinals at Baseball Almanac

St. Louis Cardinals seasons
Saint Louis Cardinals season
St Louis